Arthur Garrett "Butch" Scanlan (August 16, 1890 – July 8, 1945) was an American football coach.  He served as the head football coach at Purdue University from 1918 to 1920, compiling a record of 7–12–1.  Scanlon played college football at the University of Chicago from 1912 to 1913.  After leaving Purdue, he coached football at Hyde Park High School in Chicago.  He died of a heart attack on July 8, 1945, in Chicago.

Head coaching record

References

1890 births
1945 deaths
Chicago Maroons football players
Purdue Boilermakers football coaches
High school football coaches in Illinois
Sportspeople from Chicago
Players of American football from Chicago